Jason Holt may refer to:
 Jason Holt (businessman) director of R Holt & Co, founder of Holt's Academy of Jewellery and winner of the  Queen's Award for Enterprise Promotion
 Jason Holt (footballer) professional Scottish footballer